Ahmad Fadhli bin Shaari (Jawi: أحمد فضلي بن شعاري) (born 18 July 1980) is a Malaysian politician who has served as Chairman of the Skills Development Fund Corporation (PTPK) since April 2020 and Member of Parliament (MP) for Pasir Mas since May 2018. He is a member of the Malaysian Islamic Party (PAS), a component party of the ruling Perikatan Nasional (PN) coalition. He has also served as the Youth Chief of PN since January 2022 and of PAS since November 2021 and Deputy Youth Chief of PAS from June 2019 to November 2021.

Background 

Ahmad Fadhli was born on 18 July 1980 in Pasir Mas, Kelantan. 

He received his early education at Maahad Tahfiz Al-Quran Wal Qiraat Pulai Chondong from 1992 to 1999 and then went on to further his studies at the Sultan Ismail Petra International Islamic College (KIAS) in the state capital of Kota Bahru from 1999 to 2002. 

Later, he furthered his tertiary education at the Islamic Religious Studies faculty of the al-Azhar University in Cairo, Egypt from 2003 to 2005. 

Ahmad Fadhli had married Nor Yani Mohd Salleh with whom he has had six children.

Election results

References

Living people
1981 births
People from Kelantan
Malaysian people of Malay descent
Members of the Dewan Rakyat
21st-century Malaysian politicians
Malaysian Islamic Party politicians